The 1955 Springfield Maroons baseball team represented Springfield College in the 1955 NCAA baseball season.  The team was coached by Archie Allen in his 8th year at Springfield.

The Maroons won the District I playoff to advance to the College World Series, where they were defeated by the Arizona Wildcats.

Roster 

}

Schedule 

! style="" | Regular Season
|- valign="top" 

|- align="center" bgcolor="#ccffcc"
| 1 || April 16 ||  || Unknown • Unknown || 3–2 || 1–0
|- align="center" bgcolor="#ccffcc"
| 2 || April  ||  || Unknown • Unknown || 14–1 || 2–0
|- align="center" bgcolor="#ffcccc"
| 3 || April  ||  || Unknown • Unknown || 3–4 || 2–1
|- align="center" bgcolor="#ffcccc"
| 4 || April  || at  || Unknown • Hartford, Connecticut || 3–4 || 2–2
|- align="center" bgcolor="#ffcccc"
| 5 || April  ||  || Unknown • Unknown || 3–7 || 2–3
|- align="center" bgcolor="#ccffcc"
| 6 || April  ||  || Unknown • Unknown || 16–12 || 3–3
|-

|- align="center" bgcolor="#ffcccc"
| 7 || May 2 ||  || Unknown • Amherst, Massachusetts || 4–5 || 3–4
|- align="center" bgcolor="#ccffcc"
| 8 || May  ||  || Unknown • Unknown || 12–4 || 4–4
|- align="center" bgcolor="#ccffcc"
| 9 || May  ||  || Unknown • Unknown || 7–0 || 5–4
|- align="center" bgcolor="#ffcccc"
| 10 || May  || Providence || Unknown • Unknown || 10–14 || 5–5
|- align="center" bgcolor="#ccffcc"
| 11 || May  ||  || Unknown • Worcester, Massachusetts || 4–0 || 6–5
|- align="center" bgcolor="#ccffcc"
| 12 || May  ||  || Unknown • Springfield, Massachusetts || 4–3 || 7–5
|- align="center" bgcolor="#ccffcc"
| 13 || May  ||  || Unknown • Unknown || 4–3 || 8–5
|- align="center" bgcolor="#ccffcc"
| 14 || May  ||  || Unknown • Unknown || 14–1 || 9–5
|- align="center" bgcolor="#ccffcc"
| 15 || May  ||  || Unknown • Unknown || 17–2 || 10–5
|- align="center" bgcolor="#ccffcc"
| 16 || May  || AIC || Unknown • Unknown || 5–2 || 11–5
|- align="center" bgcolor="#ccffcc"
| 17 || May  || Williams || Unknown • Unknown || 11–5 || 12–5
|-

|-
|-
! style="" | Postseason
|- valign="top"

|- align="center" bgcolor="#ccffcc"
| 18 || June 2 ||  || Unknown • Springfield, Massachusetts || 4–3 || 13–5
|- align="center" bgcolor="#ccffcc"
| 19 || June 3 || UMass || Unknown • Springfield, Massachusetts || 17–6 || 14–5
|-

|- align="center" bgcolor="#ffcccc"
| 20 || June 10 || vs  || Omaha Municipal Stadium • Omaha, Nebraska || 1–5 || 14–6
|- align="center" bgcolor="#ffcccc"
| 21 || June 12 || vs Arizona || Omaha Municipal Stadium • Omaha, Nebraska || 0–6 || 14–7
|-

Awards and honors 
Bud Gerchell
 First Team All-American

References 

Springfield Pride baseball seasons
Springfield Maroons baseball
College World Series seasons
Springfield